Moina is a genus of crustaceans within the family Moinidae.

Moina may also refer to:

Entertainment
 Moina Beresford, a character in the Australian television soap opera Neighbours
 Moina go, a studio album by Habib Wahid
 Matir Moina, a Bengali drama film

Other uses
 Moina belli, a species of crustaceans within the family Moinidae
 Moina, Tasmania, a locality in Australia
 Stadionul Ion Moina (1911), a former stadium in Romania

People with the given name
 Moina Mathers, an artist and occultist
 Moina Meah, an alternate name for Shah Abdul Majid Qureshi, a British Bangladeshi businessman and social worker
 Moina Michael, an American professor and humanitarian

See also
 Moena, a municipality in Italy
 Moner, a surname
 Mona (disambiguation)
 Moaner (disambiguation)
 Mouna, an Algerian Jewish sweet bread
 Moine (disambiguation)
 Moyne (disambiguation)
 Moin (disambiguation)
 Moyna (disambiguation)